German School Brooklyn (GSB) is a German international school in Downtown Brooklyn in New York City.

It is categorized as a German school abroad by the Central Agency for German Schools Abroad (Zentralstelle für das Auslandsschulwesen).

History
Christine Krabs co-founded the school. It opened with grades Kindergarten through 2 in 2014 and has plans to expand to grade 12.

The school was previously on the fifth floor of the Union Temple of Brooklyn in Prospect Heights, Brooklyn. The school was not a part of the temple's congregation even though it shared a building. Grades K-3 were scheduled to remain at the temple while grades 4 and onwards were scheduled to move to a renovated property in Crown Heights. By 2021 its interim location was the former Coop School in the Bedford Stuyvesant and Clinton Hill area. In 2021 the school moved all levels to its permanent site at 9 Hanover Place in Downtown Brooklyn.

References

External links
 

International schools in New York City
German international schools in the United States
Educational institutions established in 2014
2014 establishments in New York City
Prospect Heights, Brooklyn